The May 2003 Madrilenian regional election was held on Sunday, 25 May 2003, to elect the 6th Assembly of the Community of Madrid. All 111 seats in the Assembly were up for election. The election was held simultaneously with regional elections in twelve other autonomous communities and local elections all throughout Spain.

As a result of the election, the People's Party (PP) lost its absolute majority in the Assembly, thus leaving the way open for a coalition government between the Spanish Socialist Workers' Party (PSOE) and United Left (IU) to be formed. A major political scandal ensued after two PSOE deputies—Eduardo Tamayo and María Teresa Sáez—broke party discipline and refused to support PSOE regional leader Rafael Simancas's investiture. The prospective PSOE–IU alliance found itself commanding 54 seats against the 55-strong PP, which would not be able to bring its candidate, Esperanza Aguirre, through an investiture vote as the rebel PSOE MPs would not vote for her either. With no candidate able to obtain the required votes to become President, the regional Assembly was dissolved on 28 August 2003 and a snap election was held in October 2003.

Overview

Electoral system
The Assembly of Madrid was the devolved, unicameral legislature of the autonomous community of Madrid, having legislative power in regional matters as defined by the Spanish Constitution and the Madrilenian Statute of Autonomy, as well as the ability to vote confidence in or withdraw it from a regional president.

Voting for the Assembly was on the basis of universal suffrage, which comprised all nationals over 18 years of age, registered in the Community of Madrid and in full enjoyment of their political rights. All members of the Assembly of Madrid were elected using the D'Hondt method and a closed list proportional representation, with an electoral threshold of five percent of valid votes—which included blank ballots—being applied regionally. The Assembly was entitled to one member per each 50,000 inhabitants or fraction greater than 25,000.

Election date
The term of the Assembly of Madrid expired four years after the date of its previous election. Elections to the Assembly were fixed for the fourth Sunday of May every four years. The previous election was held on 13 June 1999, setting the election date for the Assembly on Sunday, 25 May 2003.

The president had the prerogative to dissolve the Assembly of Madrid and call a snap election, provided that no motion of no confidence was in process, no nationwide election was due and some time requirements were met: namely, that dissolution did not occur either during the first legislative session or within the legislature's last year ahead of its scheduled expiry, nor before one year had elapsed since a previous dissolution. In the event of an investiture process failing to elect a regional president within a two-month period from the first ballot, the Assembly was to be automatically dissolved and a fresh election called. Any snap election held as a result of these circumstances would not alter the period to the next ordinary election, with elected deputies merely serving out what remained of their four-year terms.

Background
The PP had replaced the PSOE in government after 12 years of Socialist rule as a result of the 1995 election. In the 1999 election, the PP, under Alberto Ruiz-Gallardón, managed to maintain their absolute majority, despite the opposition PSOE recovering lost ground. For the 2003 election, the ruling PP had switched leadership: President Ruiz-Gallardón ran as candidate for the office of Mayor of Madrid, while senator and former minister Esperanza Aguirre was selected to lead the regional list.

Parties and candidates
The electoral law allowed for parties and federations registered in the interior ministry, coalitions and groupings of electors to present lists of candidates. Parties and federations intending to form a coalition ahead of an election were required to inform the relevant Electoral Commission within ten days of the election call, whereas groupings of electors needed to secure the signature of at least 0.5 percent of the electorate in the Community of Madrid, disallowing electors from signing for more than one list of candidates.

Below is a list of the main parties and electoral alliances which contested the election.

Opinion polls
The table below lists voting intention estimates in reverse chronological order, showing the most recent first and using the dates when the survey fieldwork was done, as opposed to the date of publication. Where the fieldwork dates are unknown, the date of publication is given instead. The highest percentage figure in each polling survey is displayed with its background shaded in the leading party's colour. If a tie ensues, this is applied to the figures with the highest percentages. The "Lead" column on the right shows the percentage-point difference between the parties with the highest percentages in a poll. When available, seat projections determined by the polling organisations are displayed below (or in place of) the percentages in a smaller font; 56 seats were required for an absolute majority in the Assembly of Madrid (52 until 1 January 2003).

Results

Overall

Elected legislators
The following table lists the elected legislators sorted by order of election.

Aftermath

Tamayazo scandal
In the end, the People's Party won the election but fell some 25,000 votes short of a majority, with 55 out of 111 seats. The other two forces in the newly elected Assembly, the PSOE with 47 seats and IU with 9, started negotiations to form a coalition government, which included the election of a favourable President of the Assembly (i.e. Speaker) and Bureau. As part of the deal, Socialists would control the majority of the government, but a disproportionate amount of the budget would be under the responsibility of IU regional ministers. This sparked criticism from some sectors in the Socialist party, but then-leader Rafael Simancas dismissed them as moot, saying "it was time for a government of the left in Madrid".

However, when the opening session of the new legislature began and the temporary president called for the election of the Speaker to start, concern spread through the Socialist ranks: two of their Assembly Members (AMs) were missing, leaving the left-wing coalition with 54 seats against the 55-strong People's Party. At Mr. Simancas' request, the vote was delayed for 15 minutes but finally the PP forced its commencement. The result was the election of the PP AM Concepción Dancausa as Speaker and a PP-favorable Bureau (4 members against 2 Socialists and 1 IU).

The scandal swept into the media, making the two "absent" AMs, Eduardo Tamayo and María Teresa Sáez, the most sought-after people in Madrid that day. Suddenly, they granted a TV interview in which they explained their reasons for not showing up: the coalition deal with United Left, they insisted, was not fair to the voters, who had chosen the Socialists over IU more than five to one. Tamayo argued that "90% of the PSOE programme is irreconcilable with that of IU" Furthermore, both felt their concerns were too quickly dismissed they were raised in the internal party apparatus, which they criticised as being too willing to reach power no matter what the cost. In response, party leader Rafael Simancas, who denied such concerns were actually voiced in party meetings, started the procedure to expel them from the party. He then fired a full round towards the PP, which he accused of bribing the two AMs to prevent a left-wing government in Madrid and "using paychecks to change the election results". The rival party quickly denied all accusations and sued the PSOE for calumnies. The two parties immediately engaged in a political and media dogfight for the whole summer, while the third party in dispute, IU, only mildly criticised the PP and distanced itself from the confrontation.

The situation in the Assembly was no better, as the two PSOE AMs continued not to attend: even though the conservatives held a theoretical majority with 55 seats out of 109 and could push some decisions through, neither it nor the rival coalition could command the absolute majority of 56 seats required for the election of the President of Madrid. The People's Party was rumoured to be planning an investiture vote for its candidate Esperanza Aguirre, who called for the dissolution of the Assembly and fresh elections. The proposal was not moot, since the law governing the election of the regional President requires an absolute majority in the first vote, but only a plurality in a second poll, making the left-wing coalition unable to block the election of its arch-rival. Furthermore, the PP requested the legal services of the House to determine whether the "majority" would actually be defined to be 55 seats, since the two socialist AMs had never been sworn into their seats.

In response, the two AMs notified the Speaker they would finally enter the Assembly at its next meeting, which created an even more awkward situation: there was no viable majority, since the Socialist party had expelled them, denounced them as "traitors" and refused to accept their votes in an investiture session. Then, Assembly Speaker, PP AM Concepción Dancausa announced that she would be forced to call new elections if no candidate could heed the confidence of the House. In a bid to delay the new elections until after the summer, Socialist leader Rafael Simancas, who had pushed for a parliamentary investigation of the events, requested a vote for his investiture to be scheduled. He claimed not to intend to be elected, even though Tamayo and Sáez had offered their support should the pact with IU be modified. With Tamayo and Saez abstaining, Simancas lost the vote in a session marked by accusations and counter-accusations between the different groupings.

During the summer, a parliamentary committee was formed and put to work investigating the causes of the "betrayal". The left-wing coalition was cornered in the choice of committee members, since there was no way they could have a majority: either they followed the letter of the Assembly rules and allotted at least a member to each parliamentary group (thus again leaving the majority in the hands of Tamayo and Sáez) or accepted the PP proposal by which the House denied the two AMs representation in the committee on the grounds that they were the actual object of investigation (thus giving the majority to the conservatives). The latter choice was finally implemented and, after a month of 12-hour sessions in which many prominent politicians and businessmen from both sides were summoned and vast amounts of vitriol were served by both mainstream parties, the committee passed a report concluding Tamayo and Sáez were not bribed by PP and placing full blame on the PSOE. The report, however, was defeated in the full House vote, in which the two AMs (who could not then be barred from participating) joined the left-wing coalition in their "no" vote even though they kept defending their innocence.

Fresh elections were held on October 26, 2003, with the Socialists centering its campaign on the "stolen elections". Tamayo and Sáez created a new political party called New Socialism, gathering about 6,000 votes and no seats. The new result, with a slightly reduced turnout, was a majority for the PP, which ironically gained two seats (up to 57) from the PSOE (down to 45), while IU raised its voter share and fell just short of getting one more seat (but finally repeated its previous result of 9). About a month later, PP leader Esperanza Aguirre won the investiture vote and was sworn in as the 3rd President of the Autonomous Community of Madrid.

2003 failed investiture attempt
Investiture processes to elect the President of the Community of Madrid required for an absolute majority—more than half the votes cast—to be obtained in the first ballot. If unsuccessful, a new ballot would be held 48 hours later requiring of a simple majority—more affirmative than negative votes—to succeed. If none of such majorities were achieved, successive candidate proposals could be processed under the same procedure. In the event of the investiture process failing to elect a regional President within a two-month period from the first ballot, the Assembly would be automatically dissolved and a snap election called.

References
Opinion poll sources

Other

2003 in the Community of Madrid
Madrid
Regional elections in the Community of Madrid
May 2003 events in Europe